Lindmania argentea is a plant species in the genus Lindmania. This species is endemic to Venezuela.

References

argentea
Flora of Venezuela